Bakarpur is a large village in Mohali district in the Indian state of Punjab. Bakarpur had previously been shifted from Ambala district to Rupnagar district on formation of Haryana state on 1 November 1966. Further, on formation of Mohali district, it had been shifted to it in 2006. Now it is getting developed fast like a town. There is a large market, government senior secondary school, Primary health centre, veterinary hospital, IndusInd Bank, HDFC Bank and Punjab Gramin Bank. In 2009/10 large area of cultivated land of Bakarpur was acquired by the Greater Mohali Area Development Authority (GMADA) for construction of a  road from Mohali City to Mohali Airport which is also being connected to the Zirakpur-Patiala Road. Now the GMADA is going to develop new sectors along with this road and the same has been named as Aerocity. In year 2010 residential plots have been allotted by GMADA to the public by draw of lots. This village is on the newly created Mohali airport road.

Sarhind to bakarpur 

Language
Puadhi and Punjabi are main spoken languages in Bakarpur. Hindi is the second language in this village.

Administration
The village is managed by Gram Panchayat.

Dera Dargah Sharif Bakarpur
 

Sai Surinder Singh is currently the chief dera head of dargah sharif Bakarpur.Surinder Singh was born on 11 November 1988 at Bakarpur. 

There is a popular shrine in the village known as Dera Bakarpur, where all the 5 pirs live. These pirs are Gogaji Jahar Peer, Bagad, Lakhdata pir, Ghauns Paak Sarkaar (11vi da peer), Sabir Pak (Baba Farid's nephew), Hazarat Sheikh Malerkotla and khvaja pir.  Dera Bakarpur is the home for the family of Ali. This place is also known as the Darbaar of Sarkar Abdul Qadir Jalani Gyarnvi wali Sarkar Hajrate Sayeed Janaab "Ghauns Paak" peer ji and Guga Jahar Veer ji. As per tradition people visit the Dera Bakarpur to fulfil their wishes and to obtain the blessings of God.

Village pond and migratory birds
The village has a large size village pond which contain water for most of the period of the year. In winter this pond attracts a large number of migrant birds. But area of this pond has now been acquired by Punjab Government along with other area of village to develop well known township of Mohali known as Aerocity City and this pond is likely to be abolished possibly to develop the commercial complex here . In the coming seasons these birds may not come here again. Migratory birds visiting this pond include cormorant, purple heron, grey horn, painted stork, and many local water birds and sparrow.

Gallery migratory birds

Gurudwaras & temples
 Gurudwara Dera Sahib
 Gurudwara Shaheed Bhai Sangat Singh
 Gurudwara Singh Sabha
 Gugga Maari

Attractions 
The Mahendra Chaudhary Zoological Park (Chhatbir Zoo) located in Chhatt village  from Bakarpur village.

References

External links
 The Bakarpur Pond (Bird Photography)

Mohali
Villages in Sahibzada Ajit Singh Nagar district
Birdwatching sites in India